Pink Farm Cemetery is a small Commonwealth War Graves Commission burial ground for the dead of World War I located near the village of Krithia on the Gallipoli Peninsula in Turkey. It contains the remains of some of the allied troops who died during the Battle of Gallipoli.

Sotiri Farm was named Pink Farm by the allied troops after the colour of the soil. Three cemeteries were constructed around the farm, and were combined on the site of Pink Farm Cemetery No 3, which contained 139 graves, after the Armistice and enlarged as bodies from other areas were brought to it.

External links
 
 
 Pink Farm Cemetery, Helles at Find a Grave

Commonwealth War Graves Commission cemeteries in Gallipoli